Jung Dae-young (Hangul: 정대영, Hanja: 鄭大永; born 12 August 1981) is a South Korean volleyball player. 
She was part of the South Korea women's national volleyball team.

She participated at the 2001 FIVB World Grand Prix, and at the 2010 FIVB Volleyball Women's World Championship in Japan.

She was part of the silver medal winning team at the 2010 Asian Games.

She has twice represented South Korea at the Summer Olympics, being part of the teams that finished in 5th in 2004 and 4th in 2012.

Club career 
 Played with Suwon Hyundai Engineering & Construction Hillstate (1999-2007)
 Played with GS Caltex Seoul KIXX (2007-2014)
 Played with Gimcheon Korea Expressway Hi-pass (2014-)

References

1981 births
Living people
South Korean women's volleyball players
Asian Games medalists in volleyball
Volleyball players at the 2002 Asian Games
Volleyball players at the 2006 Asian Games
Volleyball players at the 2010 Asian Games
Volleyball players at the 2004 Summer Olympics
Volleyball players at the 2012 Summer Olympics
Olympic volleyball players of South Korea
Asian Games silver medalists for South Korea
Medalists at the 2002 Asian Games
Medalists at the 2010 Asian Games
People from Cheongju
Sportspeople from North Chungcheong Province